Filippo Brizzi or Briccio or Brizio (1603–1675) was an Italian painter of the Baroque period. He was born in Bologna, the son of painter and engraver, Francesco Brizzi. Filippo became a pupil of Guido Reni. He painted for the church of San Silvestre at Bologna and also an altar-piece representing Virgin Mary with St. John the Baptist and St. Silvester and St. Giuliano crowned by Angels for the church of San Giuliano.

References

1603 births
17th-century Italian painters
Italian male painters
Painters from Bologna
Italian Baroque painters
1675 deaths